Dapeng Bay or Dapeng Wan is a lagoon in Donggang Township, Pingtung County, Taiwan. It is the largest lagoon on the southwest coastline of Taiwan Island.

Scenic Area
The Dapeng Bay National Scenic Area is a nationally protected area that includes the bay as well as nearby Liuqiu Island.

Transportation
The bay is accessible within walking distance west of Zhen'an Station of Taiwan Railways Administration.

References

External links

 Dapeng Bay National Scenic Area (governmental site)

Landforms of Pingtung County
Bays of Taiwan
Lagoons of Asia
National scenic areas of Taiwan